Vadena is a comune (municipality) in South Tyrol in northern Italy, located about  southwest of the city of Bolzano. It is one of only five mainly Italian speaking municipalities in South Tyrol.

Geography

Vadena borders the following municipalities: Auer, Bolzano, Bronzolo, Eppan, Kaltern, Laives and Tramin.

Frazioni
The municipality of Vadena contains the frazione (subdivision) Piccolongo (Piglon) and is home to the medieval castle of Laimburg.

History

Coat-of-arms
The emblem is party per fess of argent and vert with a thin fess of argent under the division. In the first part is depicted in a central position, a green mountain with the ruins of a tower, and on each side two  highest mountains. In the second part is a thin barry wavy of argent. The emblem symbolizes the geographical position of the municipality: the ruins of the tower represent the Laimburg Castle, the two peaks the Mitterberg, the thin band the motorway A22 and that wavy the river Adige. The coat of arms was granted in 1969.

Society

Linguistic distribution
According to the 2011 census, 61.50% of the population speak Italian, 38.06% German and 0.44% Ladin as first language.

Demographic evolution

References

External links
 Homepage of the municipality

Municipalities of South Tyrol